Maroua Mathlouthi (born August 22, 1988 in Tunis) is a Tunisian swimmer, who specialized in freestyle and individual medley events. She is a multiple-time Pan Arab Games champion, and a two-time gold medalist for her respective categories (800 m freestyle and 400 m individual medley) at the 2006 African Swimming Championships in Dakar, Senegal. Mathlouthi had won a total of four medals, including three silver for the women's freestyle (200, 400, and 1500 m) at the 2007 All-Africa Games in Algiers, Algeria. 

Mathlouthi was slated to compete in a medley double at the 2008 Summer Olympics in Beijing, but withdrew from the competition for personal and health reasons.

Mathlouthi also served as a varsity swimmer of the SMU Mustangs at the Southern Methodist University in Dallas, Texas, and a member of Amiens Metropole Natation in Amiens, France. She is also the sister of Ahmed Mathlouthi, who competed in the men's 200 m freestyle at the 2012 Summer Olympics in London.

References

External links
NBC Olympics Profile

1988 births
Living people
Tunisian female swimmers
Tunisian female freestyle swimmers
Female medley swimmers
Sportspeople from Tunis
African Games silver medalists for Tunisia
African Games medalists in swimming
African Games bronze medalists for Tunisia
SMU Mustangs women's swimmers
Competitors at the 2007 All-Africa Games
20th-century Tunisian women
21st-century Tunisian women